Shur Rud (also Romanized as Shūr Rūd) is a village in Eshqabad Rural District, Miyan Jolgeh District, Nishapur County, Razavi Khorasan Province, Iran. At the 2006 census, its population was 840, in 203 families.

References 

Populated places in Nishapur County